Lake Perris is an artificial lake completed in 1973. It is the southern terminus of the California State Water Project, situated in a mountain-rimmed valley between Moreno Valley and Perris, in what is now the Lake Perris State Recreation Area. The park offers a variety of recreational activities. Because of this and the lake's proximity to major population centers, it is very crowded during the summer months.

The California Office of Environmental Health Hazard Assessment has issued a safe eating advisory for any fish caught in the Lake Perris due to elevated levels of mercury and PCBs.

Ya'i Heki' Regional Indian Museum
The Ya'i Heki' Regional Indian Museum tells the story of the monumental State Water Project and focuses on the culture and history of the native peoples of the southern California desert region.

Geography 

It impounds  of water behind a 2-mile (3 km) long, 128 foot (39 m) tall, chevron-shaped earthfill dam. The untended areas of Lake Perris are somewhat rocky and barren.

An artificial reef exists on the lake floor made of old tires. The reef was created to provide a habitat for fish.

Flora and fauna 

The predominant plant community, coastal sage scrub, is host to a variety of birds and wildlife. Mule deer, roadrunners, bobcats, coyotes, rabbits, quail, gopher snakes and rattlesnakes may sometimes be seen by day, though they tend to shy away from people. More frequently seen are a wide variety of lizards, rodents, water fowl, and birds of prey. Beautiful displays of wildflowers occur during the rainy season, generally November through April.

The coastal sage scrub community is predominant on the south-facing slopes of the Russell mountains and Bernasconi hills and is characterized by shrubby plants including desert encelia, brittlebush, sagebrush, black sage, white sage, buckwheat, and cacti. Conditions are somewhat shadier on hillsides that face north or northwest so that chaparral plants such as chamise, penstemon, and poison oak are found.

Remnants of the original perennial grasses that once flourished in this region can still be found in the flat interior of the park surrounding the lake, but the majority of plants that now make up the valley grassland community (including Russian thistle) were imported from Europe by early settlers. Riparian areas near springs and seeps, and on east and south lakes include willows, cattails, elderberry and nettles.

More than a hundred species of birds have been spotted at Lake Perris. Many are migratory, and stop at the park briefly during their travels, while others make their permanent residence here. Meadowlarks, loggerhead shrikes, roadrunners, California thrashers, quail, wrens, sparrows, hummingbirds, golden eagles, several varieties of hawks, ospreys, and even bald eagles may be seen. Many varieties of waterfowl use the lake including pintails, American wigeons, green-winged teals, mallards, shovelers, various geese, and sometimes tundra swans and pelicans. black-necked stilts, avocets, killdeer, willets, kingfishers, egrets, and herons are attracted to the water's edge.

The lake has become a hotspot for freshwater game fishing. Largemouth bass, spotted bass, bluegill, rainbow trout, channel catfish, black crappie, red ear sunfish and carp are all present in the lake. As the climate is a warm one, the California Department of Fish and Game make regular plants of rainbow trout throughout the winter months. The lake records for each of the species are noted here:
 Alabama spotted bass – 9 pounds, 6 ounces
 Florida largemouth bass – 17 pounds, 6 ounces
 Bluegill – 3 pounds, 15 ounces
 Rainbow trout – 7 pounds
 Channel catfish – 30 pounds
Largemouth bass, bluegill, rainbow trout, channel catfish, black crappie, redear sunfish tend to be the primary focus of anglers. The trout usually only bite in the cooler months after the DFG plants.

Day and night, hawks and owls are frequently seen hunting for prey. The bike trail offers an easy and convenient way to see some of the birds and other wildlife of Lake Perris. Early morning or dusk are the best times. Ranger-led hikes are conducted during the spring and early summer months.
 
Most plants and animals at Lake Perris are well adapted to the hot, dry environment. Chamise leaves are tiny and waxy to minimize water loss due to evaporation. Some grasses and wildflowers rush from bloom to seed in just a few short weeks and are able to complete their life cycle within the brief wet season. Kangaroo rats are so well adapted to dry environments that they seldom drink water, and manage to extract the moisture they need directly from their food.

The plants and animals of Perris Valley have changed considerably over the last two hundred years due to human activity, but its natural history can be intriguing.

Recreation 

There are many recreational activities allowed on, in, and around Lake Perris and in the State Recreation Park.  Guided hikes are offered on the trail around the lake, and several camping sites are located near the lake side.  The lake is open for boating from 6:00 am to 6:30 pm from Thursday to Monday. Other activities include fishing, picnicking, horse-back riding, swimming (in designated areas), and rock climbing. The park also hosts the annual Big Rock Triathlon at sprint and Olympic distances. There is also a museum on the park grounds.

A nine mile paved road loops around the lake which is used to access the different areas of the lake (although the portion that runs along the top of the Perris Dam is unavailable for vehicles) and is also used by hikers, runners, and cyclists.  The northwest side of the lake has beaches and swimming areas, picnic grounds with tables and grills, camp grounds including RV camp grounds, a launch ramp, a marina, a small pier, and various peninsulas. The southwest side is the Perris Dam, and allows for rock fishing.  The southeast side has picnic grounds, camp grounds, and a rock climbing area.  The northeast side is largely left undeveloped in order to preserve the natural flora and fauna, although it is accessible to the public. Furthermore, the paved road strays away from the lake shore thus discouraging people to disturb this section of the lake. Fishing is allowed almost anywhere.    Lake Perris has one lake island called Alessandro Island, and it has picnic grounds with tables, grills, and permanent restroom facilities.  The island also has a trail that goes halfway around it. The island can only be reached by boat. There are various hiking trails to be found in the park such as those that lead to Terri Peak, the highest point in the park accessible by trail at 2,569 ft.  The highest point in the park is Mt. Russell at 2,704 ft., but no trail leads to the mountain or to its summit.

Weather 

Lake Perris and the surrounding area has hot, dry summers and cool, moist winters. Rain is almost limited to the six months between November and April. The area lies at a crossroads of weather influences. Coastal fog and smog comes from the west, while "Santa Anas"—strong, hot, dry winds—come from the deserts to the east and northeast. The average water temperature is 70 °F (21 °C) ; during the summer months, it is bathwater-warm and very pleasant to swim in.

Lake Perris water withdrawal 

For several months following July 2005, the water in Lake Perris was drawn down by about 20 percent (about 24 feet) due to safety concerns with the dam. An extensive modern study concluded that the dam could be partially breached if a 7.5 magnitude or higher earthquake were to strike in the area. Heightening the engineers' fears was the fact that the  San Jacinto Fault, easily capable of creating a 7.5 tremor, passes just a few miles north of the lake. It may take more than two years for the state to plan a course of action to bolster the dam.

All recreational activities are still allowed, with some restrictions. Most noticeably, the  boating zone has been reduced to the area between the dam and Alessandro Island. The area from the island east is now a 5 mph (wakeless speed) area. Swimming is only allowed at Perris Beach (Lots 1, 2, 3, and 4). Reservations for boats are highly recommended in the summer; weekends sell out fast. Since the drawdown there are fewer first-come, first-served spots available for watercraft. In the summer of 2006 (Memorial Day to Labor Day) most reservations sold out a week or two in advance.

2028 Summer Olympics proposal

The Los Angeles Olympic Bid for the 2028 Summer Olympic Games made an agreement with the Department of Parks and Recreation for the Lake to be host for competitive Canoe-Sprint and rowing competition when Los Angeles hosts the 2028 Summer Olympics. The bid committee preferred Lake Perris to Lake Casitas as Lake Perris is near a larger population base and is in close proximity to UCR for athletes’ accommodations. In February 2019 the International Rowing Federation announced that they had been asked to look at the possibility of using Long Beach Marine Stadium (the 1932 Olympic rowing venue) instead of Lake Perris. In 2022 World Rowing decided to use Long Beach Marine Stadium instead.

See also 

 List of dams and reservoirs in California
 List of lakes in California

References

External links
 Lake Perris State Recreation Area
 Ya'i Heki' Regional Indian Museum
 California State Parks: Lake Concerns – Lake Perris is still 80% full!
 Perris Dam

Dams in California
California Department of Water Resources dams
Dams completed in 1973
Perris, Lake
Parks in Riverside County, California
Moreno Valley, California
Perris, California
State parks of California
California State Water Project
Perris, Lake
Perris
Perris